Rafflesia ciliata is a plant species in the genus Rafflesia.

References

ciliata